is a Japanese actress and voice actress from Saitama Prefecture. She is represented by the Enkikaku agency.

Filmography

Anime
 Detective Conan (TV), Yotsui Reika (debut; ep 39)
 Freezing (TV), Sister Margarett
 Gifū Dōdō!! Kanetsugu to Keiji (TV), Sentōin (eps 7, 11, 14)
 Golgo 13 (TV), Celia Irving (ep 35)
 Hanaukyo Maid Team, Ryuuka Jihiyo
 Inuyasha, Miroku (young)
 Kindaichi Case Files, Michiyo
 Mushibugyō, Lady Sen (ep 24)
 One Piece, Conis
 Samurai 7, Yukino
 Sgt. Frog, Kaguya (ep 76)
 Simoun, ground crew B (ep 17)
 Mobile Suit Gundam: The 08th MS Team, Twins
 Tokyo Mew Mew, Ryo's Mother (ep 36)
 True Tears, Shinichirō's mother
 Turn A Gundam, Dianna Soriel; Kihel Heim
 Turn A Gundam: Earth Light (movie 1), Dianna Soreil; Kihel Heim
 Turn A Gundam: Moonlight Butterfly (movie 2), Dianna Soreil; Kihel Heim
 xxxHolic (TV), Nurie (ep 17)

Video games
Ico, Yorda
Super Robot Wars Alpha Gaiden, Dianna Soreil, Kihel Heim
Super Robot Wars Z, Dianna Soreil

Dubbing

Live-action
August Rush, Lyla Novacek (Keri Russell)
Batman Begins (2007 NTV edition), Rachel Dawes (Katie Holmes)
The Beach, Françoise (Virginie Ledoyen)
The Big Lebowski (VHS/DVD edition), Bunny Lebowski (Tara Reid)
Black Book, Rachel Stein (Carice van Houten)
The Black Dahlia, Katherine "Kay" Lake (Scarlett Johansson)
Boardwalk Empire, Margaret Thompson (Kelly Macdonald)
Bones, Dr. Camille Saroyan (Tamara Taylor)
Buffy the Vampire Slayer, Drusilla (Juliet Landau)
Deception, S (Michelle Williams)
Definitely, Maybe, April Hoffman (Isla Fisher)
Fading Gigolo, Avigal (Vanessa Paradis)
Girl, Interrupted, Susanna Kaysen (Winona Ryder)
Godzilla (2014), Vivienne Graham (Sally Hawkins)
Godzilla: King of the Monsters, Vivienne Graham (Sally Hawkins)
Gothika, Chloe Sava (Penélope Cruz)
Holmes & Watson, Rose Hudson (Kelly Macdonald)
Hugo, Lisette (Emily Mortimer)
Incendiary, Young Mother (Michelle Williams)
The Jane Austen Book Club, Prudie (Emily Blunt)
Landscapers (DC Emma Lancing (Kate O'Flynn))
Mesrine (Sofia (Elena Anaya))
Murder on the Orient Express, Pilar Estravados (Penélope Cruz)
Paranormal Activity 2, Kristi (Sprague Grayden)
Paranormal Activity 3, Kristi (Sprague Grayden)
Pecker, Shelley (Christina Ricci)
Promised Land, Alice (Rosemarie DeWitt)
Puzzle, Agnes (Kelly Macdonald)
Sabrina the Teenage Witch, Britney Spears
Saving Mr. Banks, Margaret Goff (Ruth Wilson)
Shutter Island, Rachel Solando (Emily Mortimer)
Sweet November, Sara Deever (Charlize Theron)

Animation
Tinker Bell, Silvermist
Tinker Bell and the Lost Treasure, Silvermist
Tinker Bell and the Great Fairy Rescue, Silvermist
Tinker Bell and the Secret of the Wings, Silvermist
Tinker Bell and the Pirate Fairy, Silvermist
Tinker Bell and the Legend of the NeverBeast, Silvermist
Toy Story 2, Barbie
Toy Story 3, Barbie

References

External links
 Official agency profile 
 

1967 births
Living people
Japanese musical theatre actresses
Japanese video game actresses
Japanese voice actresses
Voice actresses from Saitama Prefecture
20th-century Japanese actresses
21st-century Japanese actresses